María del Rosario Espinoza Espinoza (born November 27, 1987) is a Mexican taekwondo practitioner.

Espinoza is one of the two women from Mexico who have won an Olympic gold medal, the other being Soraya Jiménez.

Early life
Espinoza was born on 27 November 1987 in La Brecha, Sinaloa. Her father is a fisherman and mother a homemaker. She began practicing taekwondo at age five.

Career
Espinoza won her first international competition in taekwondo at the 2003 Pan American Youth Championship in Rio de Janeiro. Later she participated in Open tournaments in Canada, France, and Germany.

She won the 2007 World Taekwondo Championships in the Middleweight (–72 kg) category defeating Lee In-Jong and also won the gold medal at the 2007 Pan American Games in the Heavyweight (+67 kg) category, defeating Brazilian Natália Falavigna in the final.

She participated in the +67 kg weight class at the 2008 Beijing Olympics.  She began with a victory over Tunisian Khaoula Ben Hamza by a score of 4–0, later she beat Swedish Karolina Kedzierska 4–2. In the semifinals she qualified for the final by defeating British former world champion and eventual bronze medal winner Sarah Stevenson 4-1 and culminated in winning the gold medal by beating Norwegian Nina Solheim, earning the second gold for Mexico at the 2008 Olympics.

In 2012, María returned to the Olympics in London. She carried the flag for Mexico during the Parade of Nations and won a bronze medal. She beat Sorn Davin in the first round before losing to eventual gold medallist Milica Mandić in the quarterfinals.  In the repechage, she beat Talitiga Crawley before winning her bronze medal match against Glenhis Hernández.

In Rio 2016, Espinoza won a silver medal to become the first female Mexican athlete to earn an Olympic medal in three different Olympic Games, and the second Mexican athlete to earn Olympic medals in three consecutive editions. She carried Mexico's flag at the closing ceremony in 2016.

María Espinoza won second place in the Taekwondo world championships in Manchester on May 16, 2019.

Military
Espinoza is a member of the Mexican Army with the rank of Cabo (Corporal) auxiliar de Educación Física y Deportes. Top athletes have joined the military for the stable income and access to the best training facilities. For the 2016 Rio Olympics, 21 of the 125 Mexican athletes were part of the military. Four of the five medals won at those games were won by military personnel (María Espinoza, Germán Sánchez, Ismael Hernández and Lupita González).

Education
Espinoza studied Business Administration at the Universidad del Valle de Mexico. She was inducted into the university's Sports Hall of Fame.

References

External links

1987 births
Living people
Mexican female taekwondo practitioners
Olympic gold medalists for Mexico
Olympic taekwondo practitioners of Mexico
Taekwondo practitioners at the 2007 Pan American Games
Taekwondo practitioners at the 2008 Summer Olympics
Taekwondo practitioners at the 2012 Summer Olympics
Sportspeople from Sinaloa
Olympic medalists in taekwondo
Olympic bronze medalists for Mexico
Medalists at the 2012 Summer Olympics
Medalists at the 2008 Summer Olympics
Pan American Games gold medalists for Mexico
Pan American Games silver medalists for Mexico
Taekwondo practitioners at the 2016 Summer Olympics
Olympic silver medalists for Mexico
Medalists at the 2016 Summer Olympics
Pan American Games medalists in taekwondo
Taekwondo practitioners at the 2015 Pan American Games
Central American and Caribbean Games gold medalists for Mexico
Central American and Caribbean Games bronze medalists for Mexico
Competitors at the 2006 Central American and Caribbean Games
Competitors at the 2010 Central American and Caribbean Games
Competitors at the 2014 Central American and Caribbean Games
World Taekwondo Championships medalists
Central American and Caribbean Games medalists in taekwondo
Medalists at the 2015 Pan American Games
20th-century Mexican women
21st-century Mexican women